The 2015–16 UEFA Champions League knockout phase began on 16 February and concluded on 28 May 2016 with the final at San Siro in Milan, Italy, to decide the champions of the 2015–16 UEFA Champions League. A total of 16 teams competed in the knockout phase.

Times are CET/CEST, as listed by UEFA (local times are in parentheses).

Round and draw dates
All draws were held at UEFA headquarters in Nyon, Switzerland.

Format
The knockout phase involved the 16 teams which qualified as winners and runners-up of each of the eight groups in the group stage.

Each tie in the knockout phase, apart from the final, was played over two legs, with each team playing one leg at home. The team that scored more goals on aggregate over the two legs advanced to the next round. If the aggregate score was level, the away goals rule would be applied, i.e. the team that scored more goals away from home over the two legs advanced. If away goals were also equal, then thirty minutes of extra time would be played. The away goals rule would be again applied after extra time, i.e. if there were goals scored during extra time and the aggregate score was still level, the visiting team would advance by virtue of more away goals scored. If no goals were scored during extra time, the tie would be decided by penalty shoot-out. In the final, which was played as a single match, if scores were level at the end of normal time, extra time would be played, followed by penalty shoot-out if scores remained tied.

The mechanism of the draws for each round was as follows:
In the draw for the round of 16, the eight group winners were seeded, and the eight group runners-up were unseeded. The seeded teams were drawn against the unseeded teams, with the seeded teams hosting the second leg. Teams from the same group or the same association could not be drawn against each other.
In the draws for the quarter-finals onwards, there were no seedings, and teams from the same group or the same association could be drawn against each other.

On 17 July 2014, the UEFA emergency panel ruled that Ukrainian and Russian clubs would not be drawn against each other "until further notice" due to the political unrest between the countries.

Qualified teams

Bracket

Round of 16
The draw was held on 14 December 2015. The first legs were played on 16, 17, 23 and 24 February, and the second legs were played on 8, 9, 15 and 16 March 2016.

Summary

Matches

VfL Wolfsburg won 4–2 on aggregate.

Real Madrid won 4–0 on aggregate.

Paris Saint-Germain won 4–2 on aggregate.

Barcelona won 5–1 on aggregate.

Bayern Munich won 6–4 on aggregate.

0–0 on aggregate. Atlético Madrid won 8–7 on penalties.

Benfica won 3–1 on aggregate.

Manchester City won 3–1 on aggregate.

Quarter-finals
The draw was held on 18 March 2016. The first legs were played on 5 and 6 April, and the second legs were played on 12 and 13 April 2016.

Summary

Matches

Real Madrid won 3–2 on aggregate.

Bayern Munich won 3–2 on aggregate.

Atlético Madrid won 3–2 on aggregate.

Manchester City won 3–2 on aggregate.

Semi-finals
The draw was held on 15 April 2016. The first legs were played on 26 and 27 April, and the second legs were played on 3 and 4 May 2016.

Summary

Matches

Real Madrid won 1–0 on aggregate.

2–2 on aggregate; Atlético Madrid won on away goals.

Final

The final was played on 28 May 2016 at San Siro in Milan, Italy.

Notes

References

External links
2015–16 UEFA Champions League

Knockout Phase
2015-16